First Lady of Egypt ({{lang-ar|}) is the unofficial title of the wife of the president of Egypt.

History

Naglaa Mahmoud, wife of former president Mohamed Morsi (2012–2013), rejected the title of First Lady, preferring to be called "First Servant," the "president's wife," or "Um Ahmed," a traditional name which means mother of Ahmed, her oldest son.

First ladies of Egypt (1953–present)

See also

 List of presidents of Egypt

References

Politics of Egypt
Presidents of Egypt
Egypt